Shyam Bhakta Thapa is the 18th IGP of Nepal and the last police officer of Nepal Police to serve as the police chief during the Maoists Insurgency. He was preceded by Pradip Shumsher J.B.R. as the police chief and was succeeded by Om Bikram Rana. He had been the police chief during the Peoples Movement II.

References

Living people
Year of birth missing (living people)
Nepalese police officers
Chiefs of police
Inspectors General of Police (Nepal)
People of the Nepalese Civil War